Arrows of Desire is a novel by Geoffrey Household published in 1985.

Plot summary
Arrows of Desire is a novel in which future Britain is administered by the benevolent Euro-African Federation.

Reception
Dave Langford reviewed Arrows of Desire for White Dwarf #92, and stated that "Even a throwaway joke about the lost lore silicon chips is contradicted by the presence of sophisticated electronics, lasers, tracker-robots resembling Jeter's slow bullet, etc. Editors are supposed to spot these things."

Reviews
Review by Martyn Taylor (1987) in Paperback Inferno, #68

References

1985 novels